Abi Elphinstone is a British children's author.

Early life
Elphinstone grew up up near Edzell in Angus, Scotland. At St Leonards School, she was dyslexic, and deemed "unteachable". She is one of four children, two others of whom are also dyslexic.

She studied English at the University of Bristol, before working as a teacher in Africa, Berkshire, and London.

Career
Her first book was published in 2015, and by March 2020 had sold 225,000 books.

Personal life
Elphinstone is married to Edo, who works in finance, and they have two children.

Publications
Sky Song, 2018
Everdark
The Snow Dragon, 2019
The Frost Goblin
The Crackledawn Dragon
Rumblestar
"Saving Neverland"

References

External links

Living people
Alumni of the University of Bristol
British children's writers
21st-century British women writers
People from Angus, Scotland
People educated at St Leonards School
Year of birth missing (living people)
Writers with dyslexia